David Fraser may refer to:

 David Fraser (bowls) (1878–?), Scottish lawn bowler
 David Kennedy Fraser (1888–1962), Scottish psychologist, educator and amateur mathematician
 David Fraser (British Army officer) (1920–2012), British general and author
 David W. Fraser (born 1944), Swarthmore College president, epidemiologist and nonprofit leader 
 David Fraser (military officer) (fl. 1980–2011), Canadian general
 David B. Fraser (fl. 2015), screenwriter and winner of the 2015 Canadian Screen Awards for The Captive